Cox's Bazar Polytechnic Institute (also known as CBPI) is a technical institutions in Bangladesh. This polytechnic institute was established in 2004. This organization currently has 4 departments running in the four-year Diploma-in-Engineering course.

Location 
BECIC Industrial Area, Link Road, Jhilongja Union, Cox's Bazar Sadar.

History 
This institution is located in the south of Chittagong and it started its journey in 2004. In the first batch, the institute started with a total of 29 students in computer technology, and later this department added 3 more departments.

Technology 
Academic technologies include:
  Civil Technology (CT)
  Computer Technology (CMT)
 Refrigeration and Air-conditioning (RAC) Technology 
 Food Technology (FT)
 Tourism and Hospitality Management (THM)
 Electrical Technology (ET)

Hostel 
The campus authorities do not have the hostel facilities.

References

External links 
 official website 

Polytechnic institutes in Bangladesh
Educational institutions established in 2004
2004 establishments in Bangladesh